The mixed team W1 was one of three team events held at the 2020 Summer Paralympics in Tokyo, Japan. It contain seven teams of one man and one woman. The ranking round was held on 27 August.

Following a ranking round, the teams ranked 2nd to 7th entered the knockout rounds at the quarterfinal stages, with the highest seeded team entering in the semi final round. The losing semifinalists played off for the bronze medal. Knockouts were decided on an aggregate score basis, with each archer shooting 8 arrows apiece.

Results

Ranking round

Elimination round

References 

Team W1